The Lycoming O-435 is an American six-cylinder, horizontally opposed fixed-wing aircraft and helicopter engine made by Lycoming Engines. The engine is a six-cylinder version of the four-cylinder Lycoming O-290.

Design and development
The powerplant is a horizontally opposed Lycoming six-cylinder design. It is a direct-drive or geared, air-cooled, and normally aspirated engine. The cylinders have steel barrels with aluminum heads, and the valves are operated by hydraulic lifters. The crankshaft is supported in an aluminum-alloy split case by four main bearings and one ball-thrust bearing, and lubricating oil is supplied from a 12 quart wet sump. The camshaft rides in journals that do not employ bearing inserts. The accessory housing supports two magnetos, a starter, a generator, and a dual tach drive. A spare mounting pad is included for a vacuum pump.

Variants
All engines have an additional prefix preceding the 435 to indicate the specific configuration of the engine. There are also numerous engine suffixes, denoting different accessories such as different manufacturers' carburetors, or different magnetos.

O-435 models
O-435
Type certified on February 11, 1942.
O-435-A
Type certified on February 11, 1942.
O-435-A2
Engine model with a redesigned improved crankcase, cylinders, valves and valve seats, exhaust valve guides and rocker shaft bushing. It also has provisions for automotive-type accessories. Type certified on October 19, 1949 and cancelled on February 25, 1944.
O-435-A3
Type certified on January 5, 1951 and cancelled on February 8, 1955.
O-435-B (military designation O-435-5)
Type certified on October 7, 1943 and cancelled on November 2, 1950.
O-435-C (military designation O-435-1)
Type certified on January 11, 1943.
O-435-C1 (military designation O-435-11)
Type certified on January 2, 1948.
O-435-C2 (military designation O-435-13)
Type certified on January 2, 1948.
O-435-K
Engine model that incorporates a GO-435-C2 accessory case and crankcase. Type certified on January 24, 1951.
O-435-K1 (military designation O-435-4)
Engine model with increased maximum continuous rating and the generator pad omitted, approved for helicopter installations. Type certified on March 30, 1951.
O-435-2
Military engine model.
O-435-2-M1
Civil modified military engine model, by the Associated Aircraft Modification Company, with Bendix PS-5C carburetor with 380123-1 setting. Only military O-435-2 engines with serial numbers L00849-11 through L-1117-11 are eligible for this modification.

GO-435 models
GO-435
Baseline geared engine model. It incorporates six 3rd-order crankshaft torsional vibration dampers and reduction gearing. Type certified on August 30, 1944 and cancelled on November 2, 1950.
GO-435-A2
Type certified on October 19, 1949 and cancelled on February 8, 1955.
GO-435-C2 (military designation O-435-17)
Geared engine model which incorporates an improved crankcase and cylinder assembly. Type certified on October 19, 1949.
GO-435-C2A
Type certified on January 2, 1951, cancelled on February 8, 1955 and reinstated July 15, 1955.
GO-435-C2A2
Type certified on October 24, 1957.
GO-435-C2B
Geared engine model with provisions for a hydraulic propeller and governor. Type certified on November 6, 1952.
GO-435-C2B1
Geared engine model which incorporates a dual generator and vacuum pump drive. Type certified on February 8, 1955.
GO-435-C2B2
Geared engine model with S6LN-20, or -21 magnetos. Type certified on February 28, 1956.
GO-435-C2C
Type certified on November 24, 1953 and cancelled on July 5, 1956.
GO-435-C2D
Type certified on July 20, 1954 and cancelled on July 5, 1956.
GO-435-C2E
Geared engine model with S6LN-20, or -21 magnetos. Type certified on September 27, 1956.
GO-435-D1
Geared engine model with a dry sump oil system and crosswise accessory drives. It produces  at 3400 rpm for takeoff, with a compression ratio of 7.3:1  and fitted with a Marvel MA-4-5 or PS-5BD carburetor. Type certified on September 25, 1953.

VO-435 models
VO-435
Base model, vertically-mounted engine for helicopters, with a dry sump oil system and side-mounted AN type accessory drives. Type certified on October 11, 1954. Was re-designated as VO-435-A1A.
VO-435-A1A (military designation O-435-21)
Vertically-mounted engine model for helicopters, with a dry sump oil system and side-mounted AN type accessory drives. Type certified on October 29, 1954. Re-designated from VO-435.
VO-435-A1B (military designation O-435-6)
Vertically-mounted engine model for helicopters, with a dry sump oil system and a modified accessory section. Type certified on June 10, 1955.
VO-435-A1C (military designations O-435-23, O-435-23A O-435-23B and O-435-23C)
Vertically-mounted engine model for helicopters, with a dry sump oil system, which incorporates a crankcase and oil sump modification giving increased strength and an oil pump housing which is machined for a hydraulic pump drive. Type certified on July 18, 1954.
VO-435-A1D (military designation O-435-6A)
Vertically-mounted engine model for helicopters, with a dry sump oil system, with crankcase and oil sump modifications for increased strength. Type certified on September 27, 1956.
VO-435-A1E
Vertically-mounted engine model for helicopters, with a dry sump oil system and 6RN-200 or S6LN-204 magnetos. Type certified on October 15, 1959.
VO-435-A1F
Vertically-mounted engine model for helicopters, with a dry sump oil system. It has internal piston cooling oil jets and heavy duty cylinders and may be converted to a model TVO-435-A1A. Type certified on March 6, 1961.
VO-435-B1A
Vertically-mounted engine model for helicopters, with a redesigned accessory drive section, a wet oil sump and a higher compression ratio. Type certified on December 15, 1965.
TVO-435-A1A
Turbocharged, vertically-mounted engine model for helicopters, with a dry sump oil system. Type certified on May 12, 1961.

TVO-435 models
TVO-435-A1A
Turbocharged, vertically-mounted engine model for helicopters, with a dry sump oil system. Type certified on May 12, 1961.
TVO-435-B1A (military designation O-435-25A)
Turbocharged, vertically-mounted engine model with internal piston cooling oil jets, for helicopters, with a dry sump oil system and cylinder assemblies machined for long-reach spark plugs. Type certified on November 21, 1962.
TVO-435-B1B
Turbocharged, vertically-mounted engine model for helicopters, with a dry sump oil system and TCM (formerly Bendix) S6RN-1208 and S6LN-1209 magnetos. Type certified on June 20, 1966.
TVO-435-C1A
Turbocharged, vertically-mounted engine model for helicopters, with a dry sump oil system and a T-1112 turbosupercharger. Type certified on November 21, 1962.
TVO-435-D1A
Turbocharged, vertically-mounted engine model for helicopters, with a dry sump oil system. It has a TK-0659 turbocharger and TCM (formerly Bendix) S6RN-1208 (retarded breaker) and S6LN-1209 magnetos. Type certified on March 10, 1966.
TVO-435-D1B
Turbocharged, vertically-mounted engine model for helicopters, with a dry sump oil system. It has TCM (formerly Bendix) S-200 series magnetos. Type certified on February 23, 1967.
TVO-435-E1A
Turbocharged, vertically-mounted engine model for helicopters, with a dry sump oil system and a Kelly Aerospace (formerly AiResearch) TK-0659 turbocharger. Type certified on March 7, 1967.
TVO-435-F1A
Turbocharged, vertically-mounted engine model for helicopters, with a wet sump oil system, different accessory section and a higher power rating. Type certified on January 22, 1968.
TVO-435-G1A
Turbocharged, vertically-mounted engine model for helicopters, with a dry sump oil system and a different automatic waste gate control setting for a higher power rating. Type certified on January 11, 1968.
TVO-435-G1B
Turbocharged, vertically-mounted engine model for helicopters, with a dry sump oil system and different magnetos. Type certified on November 25, 1968.
TVO-435-25
Turbocharged, vertically-mounted military engine model for helicopters, with a dry sump oil system. This military model is similar to the -A1A, except it has cylinder assemblies from the -B1A. Type certified on June 10, 1963.

Applications

Aircraft

Other
 M22 Locust - tank

Specifications (O-435-D)

See also

References

Notes

Bibliography

 Bridgman, Leonard. Jane's All the World's Aircraft 1945-46. Hammersmith, London: HarperCollinsPublishers (1994 reprint).

External links

O-438
Boxer engines
1940s aircraft piston engines